Guillemette de Neufchâtel (1260–1317) was a French noblewoman, the daughter of Amadeus, Count of Neufchâtel and his wife, Jordanna of Arberg. In 1259, her great-aunt Margaret, married Richard of Neufchâtel-en-Bourgogne. As her dowry, she brought the Lordships of Blamont, Châtelot, Belmont, and Cuisance into the marriage. The Lords of Neufchâtel-en-Bourgogne placed Blamont under the protection of the Duke of Burgundy and thus detached it from Montbéliard.  

In 1282, Guillemette married Reginald of Burgundy. They had five children:
 Othenin "the Mad" (d. 1339), who succeeded her as Count of Montbéliard
 Agnes of Montbéliard (d. 1377), married Henry I, Count of Montbéliard, who inherited Montbéliard after Othenin's death
 Joanna (d. 1347), married:
 Ulrich III, Count of Pfirt
 Rudolf Hesso, Margrave of Baden-Baden
 William, Count of Katzenelnbogen
 Margaret, married William of Antigny, Prince of Sainte-Croix
 Adelaide, married John II, Count of Chalon-Auxerre

In 1283, her great-grandfather, Theodoric III, Count of Montbéliard (1205–1283) died. He had outlived all his children and in his will, he left the County of Montbéliard to his great-granddaughter Guillemette. Theobald III of Neufchâtel, who was a grandchild of Theodoric III and who wanted Montbéliard for himself, conspired with Reginald's brother Otto IV to have Montbéliard recognized as a fief of Burgundy. To resolve this, Reginald ceded Blamont and Châtelot to Theobald.

References 

1260 births
1317 deaths
Date of birth unknown 
Date of death unknown 
Place of birth missing
13th-century French nobility
13th-century women rulers
Chalon-Arlay
Counts of Montbéliard
French suo jure nobility
French countesses
Swiss countesses
House of Montfaucon
14th-century women rulers 
13th-century French women
14th-century French nobility
14th-century French women